The 2019 Match Premier Cup was the first edition of Match Premier Cup, a friendly association football tournament played in the Qatar.

Teams

Standings

Matches

References

External links

2019 in Russian sport
January 2019 sports events in Asia
2019 in Qatari sport